Donda eurychlora is a moth of the family Erebidae first described by Francis Walker in 1858. It is found in south-east Asia, including India.

The larvae are considered a pest on Trema orientalis.

External links
Donda eurychlora walker (Noctuidae): A pest of Trema orientalis Blume

Calpinae